"Still in My Heart" is the second single from Tracie Spencer's third album, Tracie. It was sent to urban contemporary radio on October 19, 1999. It failed to make much of an impression and peaked at #88 on the Billboard Hot 100 and #36 on Hot R&B/Hip-Hop Singles and Tracks chart in 2000.

Music video
The music video was released in 2000. It shows Spencer on a beach.

Weekly charts

References

External links
 Music video on YouTube

2000 singles
Tracie Spencer songs
1999 songs
Songs written by Soulshock
Songs written by Andrea Martin (musician)
Songs written by Ivan Matias
Capitol Records singles
Songs written by Kenneth Karlin
Song recordings produced by Soulshock and Karlin